Yurivka is an urban-type settlement in Pavlohrad Raion, Dnipropetrovsk Oblast in Ukraine. It hosts the administration of Yurivka settlement hromada, one of the hromadas of Ukraine. Population: 

Yurivka is located on the left bank of the Mala Ternivka River, a left tributary of the Samara River, itself a tributary of the Dnieper.

Until 18 July 2020, Yurivka was the administrative center of Yurivka Raion. The raion was abolished in July 2020 as part of the administrative reform of Ukraine, which reduced the number of raions of Dnipropetrovsk Oblast to seven. The area of Yurivka Raion was merged into Pavlohrad Raion.

Economy

Transportation
Yurivka is on the road connecting Pavlohrad and Lozova. In Pavlograd, it has access to the Highway M04 connecting Dnipro with Pokrovsk.

A railway connecting Pavlohrad and Lozova passes through Yurivka. However, there is no passenger station in Yurivka. The closest railway station is in Varvarivka,  to the southeast.

References

Urban-type settlements in Pavlohrad Raion